Cruise Terminal is a light rail station of the Circular Line of the Kaohsiung rapid transit system. It is located in Lingya District, Kaohsiung, Taiwan.

Station overview
The station is a street-level station with two side platforms. It is located at the junction of Lingnancian Road and Haibian Road.

Station layout

Around the station
 Kaohsiung Port Cruise Terminal
 Kaohsiung Harbor Piers 17 to 20

References

2015 establishments in Taiwan
Lingya District
Railway stations opened in 2015
Circular light rail stations